A Texas confectioner and chocolatier founded by William Wirt Lamme in 1878.

William Wirt Lamme started the business in 1878 on Congress Ave., Austin, Texas. In 1885 he lost the business in a poker game. In July 1885, William's son, David Turner Lamme, came to Austin to repay the gambling debt of $800 and reclaim the Red Front Candy Store as his own. Since then, Lammes Candies has been family owned and operated in Austin, Texas and now has stores throughout the Texas Hill Country.

During the early years, William W. Lamme spent seven years testing and tasting a recipe, which would become the "Texas Chewie" Pecan Praline. Starting with minimum batches of 25 pounds, he sold them only by special request. It was not until the 1920s that a mail order department was established and the pralines became available to the public.

References

External links
 www.Lammes.com
 How Lammes Candy Has Stayed in Business for 130 Years

American chocolate companies
Manufacturing companies based in Austin, Texas
Companies established in 1878